Subacute sclerosing panencephalitis (SSPE)— also known as Dawson disease— is a rare form of progressive brain inflammation caused by a persistent infection with the measles virus. The condition primarily affects children, teens, and young adults. It has been estimated that about 2 in 10,000 people who get measles will eventually develop SSPE. However, a 2016 study estimated that the rate for unvaccinated infants under 15 months was as high as 1 in 609. No cure for SSPE exists, and the condition is almost always fatal. SSPE should not be confused with acute disseminated encephalomyelitis, which can also be caused by the measles virus, but has a very different timing and course.

SSPE is caused by the wild-type virus, not by vaccine strains.

Signs and symptoms
SSPE is characterized by a history of primary measles infection, followed by an asymptomatic period that lasts 7 years on average but can range from 1 month to 27 years. After the asymptomatic period, progressive neurological deterioration occurs, characterized by behavior change, intellectual problems, myoclonic seizures, blindness, ataxia, and eventually death.

Stages of Progression
Symptoms progress through the following 4 stages:
 Stage 1: There may be personality changes, mood swings, or depression. Fever, headache, and memory loss may also be present. This stage may last up to 6 months.
 Stage 2: This stage may involve jerking, muscle spasms, seizures, loss of vision, and dementia.
 Stage 3: Jerking movements are replaced by writhing (twisting) movements and rigidity. At this stage, complications may result in blindness or death.
 Stage 4: Progressive loss of consciousness into a persistent vegetative state, which may be preceded by or concomitant with paralysis, occurs in the final stage, during which breathing, heart rate, and blood pressure are affected. Death usually occurs as a result of fever, heart failure, or the brain’s inability to control the autonomic nervous system.

Pathogenesis
A large number of nucleocapsids are produced in the neurons and the glial cells. In these cells the viral genes that encode envelope proteins have restricted expression. As a result, infectious particles like the M protein are not produced, and the virus is able to survive persistently without evoking an immune response. Eventually the infection will lead to SSPE.

Diagnosis

According to the Merck Manual: "SSPE is suspected in young patients with dementia and neuromuscular irritability. EEG, CT or MRI, CSF examination, and measles serologic testing are done. EEG shows periodic complexes with high-voltage diphasic waves occurring synchronously throughout the recording. CT or MRI may show cortical atrophy or white matter lesions. CSF examination usually reveals normal pressure, cell count, and total protein content; however, CSF globulin is almost always elevated, constituting up to 20 to 60% of CSF protein. Serum and CSF contain elevated levels of measles virus antibodies. Anti-measles IgG appears to increase as the disease progresses.

If test results are inconclusive, brain biopsy may be needed."

Treatment
There is no cure available. If the diagnosis is made during stage 1 it may be possible to treat the disease with oral isoprinosine (Inosiplex) and intraventricular interferon alfa, but the response to these drugs varies from patient to patient, and the only accepted treatments are supportive measures such as anticonvulsants. Following onset of stage 2, the disease is invariably fatal.

Prognosis
In the classic presentation of the disease death occurs in 1 to 3 years, but faster and slower progressions can occur. Faster deterioration in cases of acute fulminant SSPE leads to death within 3 months of diagnosis. Although the prognosis is bleak for SSPE past stage 1, there is a 5% spontaneous remission rate—this may be either a full remission that may last many years or an improvement in condition giving a longer progression period or at least a longer period with the less severe symptoms.

Epidemiology
SSPE is a rare condition, although there is still relatively high incidence in Asia and the Middle East. However, the number of reported cases is declining since the introduction of the measles vaccine—eradication of the measles virus prevents the SSPE mutation and therefore the progression of the disease or even the initial infection itself.

References

Further reading

External links
 
 
 PubMed Health: Subacute sclerosing panencephalitis 
 

Inflammations
Rare diseases
Viral encephalitis
Measles
Neurodegenerative disorders
Unsolved problems in neuroscience
Slow virus diseases
Rare infectious diseases

de:Masern#Subakute sklerosierende Panenzephalitis